Oxford Township may refer to:

Canada
 Oxford Township, now part of North Grenville, Ontario
 Oxford Township, Oxford County, Ontario

United States

Illinois 
 Oxford Township, Henry County, Illinois

Iowa 
 Oxford Township, Johnson County, Iowa
 Oxford Township, Jones County, Iowa

Kansas 
 Oxford Township, Johnson County, Kansas
 Oxford Township, Sumner County, Kansas, in Sumner County, Kansas

Michigan 
 Oxford Charter Township, Michigan

Minnesota 
 Oxford Township, Isanti County, Minnesota

New Jersey 
 Oxford Township, New Jersey

North Carolina 
 Oxford Township, Granville County, North Carolina, in Granville County, North Carolina

Ohio 
 Oxford Township, Butler County, Ohio
 Oxford Township, Coshocton County, Ohio
 Oxford Township, Delaware County, Ohio
 Oxford Township, Erie County, Ohio
 Oxford Township, Guernsey County, Ohio
 Oxford Township, Tuscarawas County, Ohio

Pennsylvania 
 Oxford Township, Adams County, Pennsylvania
 Oxford Township, Philadelphia County, Pennsylvania

South Dakota 
 Oxford Township, Hamlin County, South Dakota, in Hamlin County, South Dakota

Township name disambiguation pages